Jalgaon is a city in western India. It may also refer to:

 The census town of Jalgaon, Ratnagiri, in Ratnagiri district of Maharashtra.
 A tehsil Jalgaon Jamod in Buldhana district of Maharashtra.
 A village in Niphad Talulka in Nashik district of Maharashtra.
 A Jalgaon village in Rahata taluka of Ahmednagar district in Maharashtra